Barbecue or barbeque (informally BBQ in the UK, US, and Canada; barbie in Australia; and braai in South Africa) is a term used with significant regional and national variations to describe various cooking methods that use live fire and smoke to cook the food. The term is also generally applied to the devices associated with those methods, the broader cuisines that these methods produce, and the meals or gatherings at which this style of food is cooked and served. The cooking methods associated with barbecuing vary significantly but most involve outdoor cooking.

The various regional variations of barbecue can be broadly categorized into those methods which use direct and those which use indirect heating. Indirect barbecues are associated with North American cuisine, in which meat is heated by roasting or smoking over wood or charcoal. These methods of barbecue involve cooking using smoke at low temperatures and long cooking times, for several hours. Elsewhere, barbecuing more commonly refers to the more direct application of heat, grilling of food over hot coals or a gas fire. This technique is usually done over direct, dry heat or a hot fire for a few minutes. Within these broader categorizations are further national and regional differences.

Etymology and history

The English word barbecue and its cognates in other languages come from the Spanish word barbacoa, which has its origin in an indigenous American word. Etymologists believe this to be derived from barabicu found in the language of the Arawak people of the Caribbean and the Timucua people of Florida; it has entered some European languages in the form of barbacoa. The Oxford English Dictionary (OED) traces the word to Hispaniola and translates it as a "framework of sticks set upon posts".

Spanish explorer Gonzalo Fernández De Oviedo y Valdés was the first to use the word "barbecoa" in print in Spain in 1526 in the Diccionario de la Lengua Española (2nd Edition) of the Real Academia Española. After Columbus landed in the Americas in 1492, the Spaniards apparently found Taíno roasting meat over a grill consisting of a wooden framework resting on sticks above a fire. The flames and smoke rose and enveloped the meat, giving it a certain flavor.

Traditional barbacoa involves digging a hole in the ground and placing some meat—usually a whole lamb—above a pot so the juices can be used to make a broth. It is then covered with maguey leaves and coal, and set alight. The cooking process takes a few hours. Olaudah Equiano, an African abolitionist, described this method of roasting alligators among the "Mosquito people" (Miskito people) on his journeys to Cabo Gracias a Dios in his narrative The Interesting Narrative of the Life of Olaudah Equiano.

Linguists have suggested the word was loaned successively into Spanish, then Portuguese, French, and English. In the form barbacado the word was used in English in 1648 by the supposed Beauchamp Plantagenet in the tract A description of the province of New Albion: "the Indians in stead of salt doe barbecado or dry and smoak fish".

According to the Oxford English Dictionary, the first recorded use in modern form was in 1661, in Edmund Hickeringill's Jamaica Viewed: "Some are slain, And their flesh forthwith Barbacu'd and eat"; it also appears in 1672 in the writings of John Lederer following his travels in the North American southeast in 1669–1670. The first known use as a noun was in 1697 by the English buccaneer William Dampier. In his New Voyage Round the World, Dampier wrote, "and lay there all night, upon our Borbecu's, or frames of Sticks, raised about 3 foot [] from the Ground".

As early as the 1730s, New England Puritans were familiar with barbecue, as on 4 November 1731, New London, Connecticut, resident Joshua Hempstead wrote in his diary: "I was at Madm Winthrops at an Entertainment, or Treat of Colln [Colonel] or Samll Brownes a Barbaqued." Samuel Johnson's 1755 dictionary gave the following definitions:

 "To Barbecue – a term for dressing a whole hog" (attestation to Pope)
 "Barbecue – a hog dressed whole"

While the standard modern English spelling of the word is barbecue, variations including barbeque and truncations such as bar-b-q or BBQ may also be found. The spelling barbeque is given in Merriam-Webster as a variant, whereas the Oxford Dictionaries explain that it is a misspelling which is not accepted in standard English and is best avoided. In the southeastern United States, the word barbecue is used predominantly as a noun referring to roast pork, while in the southwestern states cuts of beef are often cooked.

Associations 

Because the word barbecue came from native groups, Europeans gave it "savage connotations". This association with barbarians and "savages" is strengthened by Edmund Hickeringill's work Jamaica Viewed: with All the Ports, Harbours, and their Several Soundings, Towns, and Settlements through its descriptions of cannibalism. However, according to Andrew Warnes, there is very little proof that Hickeringill's tale of cannibalism in the Caribbean is even remotely true. Another notable false depiction of cannibalistic barbecues appears in Theodor de Bry's Great Voyages, which in Warnes's eyes, "present smoke cookery as a custom quintessential to an underlying savagery [...] that everywhere contains within it a potential for cannibalistic violence". Today, those in the U.S. associate barbecue with "classic Americana".

Styles

In American English usage in the Southern U.S, grilling refers to a fast process over high heat while barbecuing refers to a slow process using indirect heat or hot smoke, similar to some forms of roasting. In a typical U.S. home grill, food is cooked on a grate directly over hot charcoal, while in a U.S. barbecue the coals are dispersed to the sides or at a significant distance from the grate. However in the Northern U.S. the term barbecuing includes grilling; for example in northern states barbecue fare often includes grilled hot dogs and hamburgers (which in the southern states would be considered fare for grilling or a cookout).  In British usage, barbequeing refers to a fast cooking process done directly over high heat, while grilling refers to cooking under a source of direct, moderate-to-high heat—known in the United States as broiling. Its South American versions are the southern Brazilian churrasco and the Uruguayan/Argentine asado.

United States

According to estimates, prior to the American Civil War, Southerners ate around five pounds of pork for every pound of beef they consumed. Because of the effort to capture and cook these wild hogs, pig slaughtering became a time for celebration and the neighborhood would be invited to share in the largesse. In Louisiana Creole and Cajun culture, these feasts are called boucheries or "pig pickin's". The traditional Southern barbecue grew out of these gatherings.

Each Southern locale has its own variety of barbecue, particularly sauces. South Carolina is the only state that traditionally includes all four recognized barbecue sauces, including mustard-based, vinegar-based, and light and heavy tomato-based sauces. North Carolina sauces vary by region; eastern North Carolina uses a vinegar-based sauce, the center of the state uses Lexington-style barbecue, with a combination of ketchup and vinegar as their base, and western North Carolina uses a heavier ketchup base. Memphis barbecue is best known for tomato- and vinegar-based sauces. In some Memphis establishments and in Kentucky, meat is rubbed with dry seasoning (dry rubs) and smoked over hickory wood without sauce. The finished barbecue is then served with barbecue sauce on the side.

The barbecue of Alabama, Georgia, and Tennessee is almost always pork, often served with a sweet tomato-based sauce. Several regional variations exist. Alabama is also known for its distinctive white sauce—a mayonnaise- and vinegar-based sauce originating in northern Alabama, used predominantly on chicken and pork. A popular item in North Carolina and Memphis is the pulled pork sandwich served on a bun and often topped with coleslaw. Pulled pork is prepared by shredding the pork after it has been barbecued.

Kansas City-style barbecue is characterized by its use of different types of meat, including pulled pork, pork ribs, burnt ends, smoked sausage, beef brisket, beef ribs, smoked/grilled chicken, smoked turkey, and sometimes fish—a variety attributable to Kansas City's history as a center for meat packing. Hickory is the primary wood used for smoking in Kansas City, while the sauces are typically tomato based with sweet, spicy, and tangy flavors.

Pit beef prevails in Maryland and is often enjoyed at large outdoor "bull roasts", which are commonly fundraising events for clubs and associations. Maryland-style pit beef is not the product of barbecue cookery in the strictest sense; the meat is not smoked but grilled over a high heat. The meat is typically served rare with a strong horseradish sauce as the preferred condiment.

The state of Kentucky, particularly the western region around Owensboro and Henderson, is unusual in its barbecue cooking; the preferred meat is mutton. This kind of mutton barbecue is often used in communal events in Kentucky, such as political rallies, county fairs, and church fund-raising events.

Barbecue in Texas is predominantly beef due to the state's historic ties to cattle raising. Barbecue sauce flavors vary by region but generally use tomato, molasses, or mesquite flavorings as a base. Tomato based sauces tend to be typical of Central and East Texas while mollasses based tend to be of the South. West Texas sauces tend to be of a mesquite flavor.

South Africa

Braais are informal gatherings of people who convene around an open fire for any occasion and at any location with a grill. They are linked to the consistent warm weather of South Africa that leads to much communal, outdoor activity. The act of convening around a grill is reminiscent of past generations gathering around open fires after a hunt, solidifying the braais' importance to tradition. Modernity has expanding grilling to the use of gas grills, but steel grill gates and campfires are often used. The use of a gas grill is frowned upon and the use of charcoal is accepted, but wood is seen as the best method to cook the meat.

It is expected that people attending a braai bring snacks, drinks, and other meat to eat until the main meal has finished cooking on the grill. This potluck-like activity is known as "bring and braai". Cooking on the braai is a bonding experience for fathers and sons, while women prepare salads and other side dishes in kitchens or other areas away from the grill. Examples of meat prepared for a braai are lamb, steaks, spare ribs, sausages, chicken, and fish. Milie pap, also known as "Krummel pap", is a crumbled cornmeal that is often served as a side dish.

Heritage Day in South Africa, celebrated on 24 September, has also come to be known as National Braai Day, changed to Braai4Heritage, since the holiday is usually celebrated with one. Desmond Tutu advocated for National Braai Day in 2007 due to the universal enjoyment of braais across races in South Africa, stamping it as a symbol of South African heritage.

Techniques

Barbecuing encompasses multiple types of cooking techniques. The original technique is cooking using smoke at low temperatures—usually around —and significantly longer cooking times (several hours), known as smoking.

Grilling and smoking are done with wood, charcoal, gas, electricity, or pellets. The time difference between smoking and grilling is because of the temperature difference; at low temperatures used for smoking, meat takes several hours to reach the desired internal temperature.

Smoking

Smoking is the process of flavoring, cooking, and/or preserving food by exposing it to smoke from burning or smoldering material, most often wood. Meat and fish are the most common smoked foods, though cheeses, vegetables, nuts, and ingredients used to make beverages such as beer or smoked beer are also smoked.

Grilling 

Grilling is a form of cooking that involves a dry heat applied to the food, either from above or below. Grilling is an effective technique in order to cook meat or vegetables quickly since it involves a significant amount of direct, radiant heat. Outside of the U.S., this is the most common technique when cooking classic barbecue foods, although some variants of grilling require direct, but moderate heat.

The words "barbecue" and "grilling" are often used interchangeably, although food experts argue that barbecue is a type of grilling, and that grilling involves the use of a higher level of heat to sear the food, while barbecuing is a slower process over a low heat.

Other uses
The term barbecue is also used to designate a flavor added to food items, the most prominent of which are potato chips.

See also

 
 
 

 
 
 , South Africa
 
 
 
 
 
 
 
 
 
 
 , Cantonese barbecued meat

References

External links

 
 Barbecue Food Safety (U.S. Dept. of Agriculture)
 The Internet BBQ FAQ 
 Barbecue: A History of the World's Oldest Culinary Art Web cast from the Library of Congress

 
Eating parties
American cuisine
Australian cuisine
New Zealand cuisine
Baking
Canadian cuisine
Caribbean cuisine
Cooking appliances
Cooking techniques
Cuisine of the Southern United States
Culinary terminology
Kitchen
Earth oven
Fireplaces
Garden features
Haitian cuisine
Texas culture
Independence Day (United States) foods